McIvor Highway is a short Victorian highway (44 km) linking Bendigo and Heathcote. Together with Hume Freeway (until Wallan) and Northern Highway (until Heathcote), it provides an alternative route between Melbourne and Bendigo. The name 'McIvor' refers to the original name of the Heathcote region, used during the Victorian Gold Rush.

History
The passing of the Highways and Vehicles Act of 1924 through the Parliament of Victoria provided for the declaration of State Highways, roads two-thirds financed by the State government through the Country Roads Board (later VicRoads). The Eppalock Highway was declared a State Highway in the 1959/60 financial year, from Heathcote to Bendigo (for a total of 27 miles); before this declaration, this road was referred to as Heathcote-Bendigo Road. The highway was later renamed McIvor Highway in 1962.

The McIvor Highway was signed as State Route 141 between Bendigo and Heathcote in 1986; with Victoria's conversion to the newer alphanumeric system in the late 1990s, this was replaced by route B280.

Major intersections and towns
The entire highway is in the City of Greater Bendigo local government area.

See also

 Highways in Australia
 Highways in Victoria

References

Highways in Australia